Sroczyński (feminine: Sroczyńska; plural: Sroczyńscy) is a Polish surname. Notable people with the surname include:

 Magdalena Sroczyńska (born 1982), Polish figure skater
 Ryszard Sroczyński (1905–1966), Polish painter and sculptor

Polish-language surnames